Jan Polack Johannes Po(l)lack (Hanns Polagk, Polegk), (between 1435 and 1450 – 1519) was a 15th-century painter.

From his nickname it is assumed that he might have been born and/or worked in Kraków. From the mid-1470s on, he lived and worked in Munich, having previously been in Franconia. He may have taken part in the 1475 festival of the Landshut Wedding of Jadwiga Jagiellon and George of Bavaria. In 1480, he opened his own shop in Munich, where he remained until his death.

Starting in 1482, he is listed on the tax records of Munich, also as leader of the local painter guild. He visited with Michael Wohlgemuth and his art was influenced by him and by that of Veit Stoss and Hans Pleydenwurff as well as by collaboration with the woodcutter Erasmus Grasser.

Documents mention many works of his which are now lost. His most important remaining work is the Weihenstephan altarpiece (1483–1485), now at the Alte Pinakothek in Munich.

Gallery

Further reading 

Andrea Langer, "Jan Polack" in "Neue Deutsche Biographie", München 1999.
Hanna Bösl, "Jan Polack", F-polnischer Geschichte, 2004,

External links 

15th-century German painters
German male painters
16th-century German painters
16th-century Polish painters
Polish male painters
Renaissance painters
German people of Polish descent
Artists from Kraków
1430s births
1519 deaths